Polycopidae is a superfamily of marine ostracods. It is the only superfamily in the suborder Cladocopina. 

There are two families recognised in the superfamily Polycopoidea:
 Polycopidae Sars, 1865
 †Quasipolycopidae  Jones, 1995

References

Arthropod superfamilies
Halocyprida